Guillermo Torres Barrera (c.1936 – June 25, 1988) was a Colombian politician and lawyer. He served in Colombia's senate for four terms. He was 52 when he died on June 25, 1988, from a heart attack while living in Hollywood, Florida.

References

Members of the Senate of Colombia
1930s births
1988 deaths
20th-century Colombian lawyers